The Featherweight competition at the 2022 IBA Women's World Boxing Championships was held from 9 to 19 May 2022.

Results

Finals

Top half

Section 1
First round fights

Section 2
First round fights

Bottom half

Section 3
First round fights

Section 4
First round fights

References

External links
Draw

Featherweight